Micheline Dupray (born 12 March 1927 in Marsainvilliers (Loiret) is a French poet.

Works 
Poetry
1975: Merci la vie, dessins de Jacqueline et Marie-Thérèse Rault, M. Dupray
1975: « Mes yeux d'immensité » in Les Beaux poèmes contemporains. 5, Éditions Arts et littérature carolorégiens
1977: Herzégovine, Formes et languages, Prix Claire Virenque of the Académie française
1980: Trains amers, Éditions Saint-Germain-des-Prés,
2002: Souffrir ne suffit pas : une anthologie de poèmes, preface by Ratimir Pavlovic, Association internationale des traducteurs littéraires de langue française, 

Essays
 1986: Roland Dorgelès, Presses de la Renaissance, Prix Marcel Pollitzer of the Académie française 1987
 2000: Roland Dorgelès. Un siècle de vie littéraire française, Albin Michel, 

Préface
2003: Roland Dorgelès, Je t'écris de la tranchée : correspondance de guerre, 1914-1917, Albin Michel,

External links 
 Micheline Dupray on the site of the Aadémie française
  Micheline Dupray on Éditions Elexandrine

20th-century French poets
French women poets
1927 births
People from Loiret
Living people
20th-century French women writers